Crash Crew is the self-titled debut studio album by American hip hop group Crash Crew. It was released in 1984 through Sugar Hill Records. The album was never properly finished due to Sugar Hill's financial difficulties.

Track listing

References

External links

1984 debut albums
Crash Crew albums
Sugar Hill Records (hip hop label) albums